Killea GAA is a Gaelic Athletic Association club associated with the village of Killea in North County Tipperary, Ireland.

Honours
 Mid Tipperary Senior Hurling Championship (1): 1928 (with Castleiney)
 Mid Tipperary Junior A Hurling Championship (3): 1927, 1989, 1991
 Mid Tipperary Junior B Hurling Championship (1): 2007

Notable players
 Tommy Treacy

References

Gaelic games clubs in County Tipperary